Persipare stand for Persatuan Sepakbola Indonesia Parepare (en: Football Association of Indonesia Parepare). Persipare Parepare is an Indonesian football club based in Parepare, South Sulawesi. Club played in Liga 3.

References

External links
Persipare Pare-Pare Liga-Indonesia.co.id

Sport in South Sulawesi
Football clubs in Indonesia
Football clubs in South Sulawesi
Association football clubs established in 1970
1970 establishments in Indonesia